Vatamanovskaya is a rural locality (a village) in Kargopolsky District, Arkhangelsk Oblast, Russia. The population was 412 as of 2010. There are 7 streets.

Geography 
Vatamanovskaya is located 20 km northwest of Kargopol (the district's administrative centre) by road. Krasnikovskaya is the nearest rural locality.

References 

Rural localities in Kargopolsky District